is the Okinawan and Kunigami name given to the forested northern part of Okinawa Island in Japan. Spanning the northern villages of Higashi, Kunigami, and Ōgimi, Yambaru contains some of the last large surviving tracts of subtropical rainforest in Asia, with many endemic species of flora and fauna. Many southerners fled to the area for refuge during the Battle of Okinawa. In 2016, Yambaru National Park was established and the area was included in a submission for inscription on the UNESCO World Heritage List.

Yambaru currently contains the 7,500 ha US Jungle Warfare Training Centre at Camp Gonsalves. As of 2010 there were twenty-two helipads in the training area with a further seven planned within two of the best preserved areas. Issues relating to the location of helipads delayed the designation as a National Park. Threatened by clearcutting and the removal of undergrowth, various endemic species are facing an imminent extinction crisis. The US Marine Corps has noted that 'to continue to perform realistic military training activities, these habitats must be maintained.'

Biodiversity

According to the WWF, Yambaru is the habitat of over four thousand species, with eleven animals and twelve plants peculiar to the area. Many of these are threatened species on the IUCN Red List and 177 feature on the Red List of the Ministry of the Environment. Rare species include the flightless Okinawa rail (Yambaru kuina in Japanese), Okinawa woodpecker (Special Natural Monument), Ryukyu robin, Amami woodcock, Ryukyu black-breasted leaf turtle, Anderson's crocodile newt, Ishikawa's frog, Holst's frog, Namiye's frog, Ryukyu long-tailed giant rat, and Muennink's spiny rat. All these species, with the exception of the Ryukyu robin, are classified as endangered; the Muennink's spiny rat, the Okinawa woodpecker, and Yambaru whiskered bat being critically endangered.

The Okinawa woodpecker in particular is threatened both by the presence of American Ospreys from the US Marine bases on the island and by the construction of six new helipads in the forest.

Conservation and tourism
The  opened in 1999 to increase understanding of the area; in 2010 it reopened after renovation. The area is being promoted by Okinawa Prefecture for ecotourism.

See also
 Okinawa Yambaru Seawater Pumped Storage Power Station
 Issue of US bases in Okinawa
 Ryūkyū Kingdom
 National Parks in Japan
 World Heritage Sites in Japan
 Ogasawara Islands

References

External links

 Map of Yambaru (area marked in green on smaller map)
 State of Japan’s Environment at a Glance: Extinct and Endangered Species Listed in the Red Data Book

Geography of Okinawa Prefecture